Signum: Blätter für Literatur und Kritik is a biannual literary magazine published in Dresden. The editor-in-chief is Norbert Weiss. He established the journal in 1999. Each issue is around 140 pages long and includes lyrical poetry, prose, drama, essays and reviews. A regular feature, Exkurs, provides information about work from a particular region. Occasionally the journal includes supplements on particular subjects, such as Ossip Kalenter (2000) or Bardinale Dresden 2004.

External links
 

1999 establishments in Germany
Biannual magazines published in Germany
German-language magazines
Literary magazines published in Germany
Magazines established in 1999
Mass media in Dresden